The 2020 UCI America Tour was the sixteenth season of the UCI America Tour. The season began on October 23, 2019 with the Vuelta a Guatemala and ended on November 1, 2020.

The points leader, based on the cumulative results of previous races, wears the UCI America Tour cycling jersey. Throughout the season, points are awarded to the top finishers of stages within stage races and the final general classification standings of each of the stages races and one-day events. The quality and complexity of a race also determines how many points are awarded to the top finishers, the higher the UCI rating of a race, the more points are awarded.

The UCI ratings from highest to lowest are as follows:
 Multi-day events: 2.Pro, 2.1 and 2.2
 One-day events: 1.Pro, 1.1 and 1.2

Events

2019

2020

References

External links
 

 
2020
2020 in men's road cycling
2020 in North American sport
2020 in South American sport